Only Two Can Play is a 1962 British comedy film starring Peter Sellers, based on the 1955 novel That Uncertain Feeling by Kingsley Amis. Sidney Gilliat directed the film from a screenplay by Bryan Forbes.

The film is set in the fictional South Wales town of Aberdarcy, and largely filmed in and around Swansea, Amis's stated model for Aberdarcy. It was the first comedy to receive an X certificate in the United Kingdom.

Plot
John Lewis (Sellers) is a poorly paid and professionally frustrated librarian and occasional drama critic, whose affections fluctuate between glamorous Liz (Mai Zetterling), and his long-suffering wife Jean (Virginia Maskell).

When a better paid job becomes vacant, Lewis is reluctant to apply, but is persuaded to do so by Jean. Then, he meets the obviously attractive Elizabeth Gruffydd-Williams (Liz), a designer with the local amdram company and wife of a local councillor.

Liz offers to intercede with her husband to help in getting Lewis the job, and makes it clear that she is attracted to him. Lewis is easily seduced into an affair, although it remains unconsummated.

Having been persuaded by Liz to leave the theatre's new production early one evening for an assignation, Lewis submits a bogus review to the local newspaper, but learns the next morning that the theatre burned down shortly after the play commenced. Jean thus learns of the affair and retaliates by encouraging her old flame Gareth Probert (Richard Attenborough), a self-important literary character and dramatist (who wrote the ill-fated play). Lewis also loses the friendship of his colleague and best friend, Ieuan Jenkins (Kenneth Griffith), who had a role in the play.

When Lewis is offered the better paid job, he realises that Liz will now use and control him if he lets her. Finally realising the price he has paid, he breaks off the affair and takes a job as a mobile librarian, in the hope that this will keep him away from predatory women. Jean is not so sure that he can resist them, and tags along to keep an eye on him.

Cast
 Peter Sellers as John Lewis
 Mai Zetterling as Liz
 Virginia Maskell as Jean
 Kenneth Griffith as Jenkins
 Raymond Huntley as Vernon
 David Davies as Benyon
 Maudie Edwards as Mrs. Davies
 Meredith Edwards as Clergyman
 John Le Mesurier as Salter
 Frederick Piper as Mr. Davies
 Graham Stark as Mr. Hyman
 Eynon Evans as Town Hall Clerk
 John Arnatt as Bill
 Sheila Manahan as Mrs. Jenkins
 Richard Attenborough as Probert
 Howell Evans as Library Policeman (uncredited)
 Tenniel Evans as Kennedy (uncredited)
 Laurence Luxton as American GI and Driver (uncredited)
 Desmond Llewelyn as a Vicar
 George Woodbridge as a Farmer

Production
John Boulting had made a film from Lucky Jim by Kingsley Amis and Gilliat thought Amis' That Uncertain Feeling might also make a film. He had his reservations but was persuaded by the enthusiasm of Bryan Forbes, who wrote the script, and they persuaded Peter Sellers to star.

Only Two Can Play was filmed largely in and around Swansea, Amis's model for its setting, Aberdarcy; crowds of both supporters and demonstrators watched filming, and MI5 agents shadowed Zetterling, who was suspected of Communist sympathies. It was released with an X certificate, the first given to a comedy by the British Board of Film Censors, although it includes only a brief glimpse of nudity.

Gilliat says Peter Sellars was difficult during filming. The star disliked Maskell's performance and wanted her replaced by a genuine Welsh actor. Gilliat had to involve John Boulting to get the situation to quieten down.

Reception
The Times reported the film was the third most successful film at the British box office in 1962. Films and Filming said it was the fourth most popular for Britain for the year ended 31 October 1962 after The Guns of Navarone, Dr. No and The Young Ones.

It was nominated for Best Film in the 1963 BAFTA awards.

New York Times film critic Bosley Crowther wrote: "ANYBODY who could do to organized labor what Peter Sellers did with his thumping performance of a union leader in the British comedy, "I'm All Right, Jack," is clearly the fellow to do the same thing to sex. And we are pleased to be able to proclaim he does it in his latest side-splitter, Only Two Can Play. With a script by Bryan Forbes that pops perpetually with some of the brightest British quips of modern times, with Sidney Gilliat directing and with a spanking new Mai Zetterling deftly applying the itching-powders as a grandly seductive Eve, Mr. Sellers performs an old Adam that puts all recent seventh-year scratchers in the shade."

References

External links

1962 films
British comedy films
British black-and-white films
1962 comedy films
British Lion Films films
Films based on British novels
Films based on works by Kingsley Amis
Films directed by Sidney Gilliat
Films scored by Richard Rodney Bennett
Films set in Wales
Films with screenplays by Bryan Forbes
1960s English-language films
1960s British films